Huitán is a municipality in the Quetzaltenango department of Guatemala, situated on 16 km2 at 2600 m altitude, North-West from Quetzaltenango.

External links
Website of Huitan

Municipalities of the Quetzaltenango Department

pt:Quetzaltenango#Municípios